Rugby sevens has been played at every Commonwealth Games since its first appearance at the 1998 edition held in Kuala Lumpur, Malaysia.  Rugby sevens was an optional sport that was included for 2002 and 2006; it was then made a 'Core' sport by the Commonwealth Games Federation, necessitating its appearance at all future games from the 2010 Games onward. New Zealand dominated the men's tournament at its inception until 2014 when they lost for the first time at the Games, playing South Africa in the gold medal match. 2022 marked the first time that New Zealand failed to reach the gold medal match in either the men's or women's tournaments.

Until the 2014 Games, rugby sevens was a male-only sport at the Commonwealth Games, but a female tournament was added to the programme for the 2018 Commonwealth Games in Australia.

Editions

Men's

Women's

All-time medal table
Medals table for rugby sevens at the Commonwealth Games (first competed for in 1998).

Updated after the 2022 Commonwealth Games

Participating nations

Men

Women

See also
 Rugby sevens at the Summer Olympics

References

 
Sports at the Commonwealth Games
Commonwealth Games